Abutilon theophrasti (velvetleaf, velvet plant, velvetweed, Chinese jute, China jute, crown weed, buttonweed, lantern mallow, butterprint, pie-marker, or Indian mallow) is an annual plant in the family Malvaceae that is native to southern Asia. 
Its specific epithet theophrasti commemorates the ancient Greek botanist-philosopher Theophrastus. Abutilon theophrasti is the type species of the genus Abutilon.

Description
Velvetleaf grows 3–8 feet tall on branched stout stems. Their stems are covered in downy hairs. It is an annual that grows during the warmer seasons, germinating in the spring and flowering in the summer. The leaves are large and heart-shaped with pointed tips at their ends, and they grow alternately at different points along the length of the stem. The leaves are attached to thick, long stems, and when crushed, they release an odor.

Its flowers are yellow and grow up to an inch in diameter with five petals attached at the base. The flowers grow on stalks and can either be found in clusters or individually where the stalk meets the leaf stem.

Pod-like capsules produced by the plant consists of 12-15 wood segments that form cup-like rings. Through the maturation of the seeds, the segments remain joined, and when the seed are ready to be released, the outside of the capsule contains vertical slits which release mature seeds.

Biology

Reproduction 
During reproduction, the plant generates a number of seeds ranging between 700 and 44,200 units per one plant. The seeds take 17–22 days to mature once pollinated. Seeds can last for about 50 years when stored in a dry location or in the soil. In order to disperse the seeds for reproduction, each carpel in the plant is opened with a vertical slit along the outer edge. For successful germination of the seeds, the temperature must range between 24-30 °C. Due to the dry climate and high evaporation growth, Velvetleaf is unable to grow in the meadows of North America. Velvet plants are able to grow in various types of soil ranged from gray-brown podzols and sandy to clay loams. The ideal soil pH for velvetleaf ranged between 6.1 and 7.8, depending on location.

Cultivation and medicinal uses
Velvetleaf has been grown in China since around 2000 BCE for its strong, jute-like bast fibre. The leaves are edible when stir-fried or in an omelette. The plant is known as maabulha in the Maldives and its leaves were part of the traditional Maldivian cuisine, usually finely chopped and mixed with Maldive fish and grated coconut in a dish known as mas huni. The seeds are eaten in China and Kashmir. The plant is also used to make ropes, coarse cloth, nets, paper and caulk for boats, and is still cultivated in China to this day. Velvetleaf can be used as a treatment for dysentery and opacity of the cornea, and can treat eye injuries. The leaves of the velvet leaf contain 0.01% of rutin, and used for a soothing, lubricant treatment that softens irritated tissues. When the leaves are softened, they can be used a remedy for ulcers. The bark of Velvetleaf can reduce the flow of bodily fluids such as blood, secretions, mucous. It can promote the flow of urine.

Invasive species
In midwestern and northeastern regions of the United States, eastern Canada and the Eastern Mediterranean, A. theophrasti is considered a damaging weed to agricultural crops, especially corn and soybeans.

Since being introduced to North America in the 18th century, velvetleaf has become an invasive species in agricultural regions of the eastern and midwestern United States. It is one of the most detrimental weeds to corn causing decreases of up to 34% of crop yield if not controlled and costing hundreds of millions of dollars per year in control and damage. Velvetleaf is an extremely competitive plant, so much so that it can steal nutrients and water from crops. Velvetleaf is controllable by herbicides even though it is known to be a major weed to different crops. Because of the season it germinates in, the plant matures right before the fall harvest in farms. Velvetleaf is a tall plant that can cause the shorter crops around it to not thrive by severely reducing light penetration to them. Not only does it affect crop plants by starving them of light, but it also houses different diseases and pests of crops like corn, cotton, soybeans, and others. When destroyed, the plant releases a chemical odor that is also known to be harmful to surrounding crops by inhibiting germination of crop seeds when that chemical is released into the soil. Examples of pests and diseases that Velvetleaf harbors are maize pests, tobacco pests, and soybean diseases. In order to eradicate Velvetleaf, individual plants should be dug up or pulled out manually and not tilled or plowed to avoid seed germination. The plants can also be mowed while the it is still small.

This species is typically found in areas where the soil had been disturbed. This causes the dormant seeds in the soil to be brought closer to the soil's surface, allowing for growth when the soil is at an optimally warm temperature.

Threats to A. theophrasti 
Different predators and pathogens affect velvetleaf at different life stages of the plant. Examples of threats include but are not limited to:

References

External links

 Abutilon theophrasti from Plants for a Future

theophrasti
Flora of Pakistan
Flora of the Maldives
Flora of Syria